Pierre Spaperi (born 12 November 1911, date of death unknown) was a French racing cyclist. He rode in the 1938 Tour de France.

References

1911 births
Year of death missing
French male cyclists
Place of birth missing